Olga Govortsova was the defending champion, but chose not to participate.

Denisa Allertová won the title, defeating Zheng Saisai 6–3, 2–6, 6–4 in the final.

Seeds

Main draw

Finals

Top half

Bottom half

References 
 Main draw

Zhuhai Open - Singles
Zhuhai Open